Dmitry Abramovitch (born October 30, 1982) is a Russian bobsledder who has competed since 2005. His best Bobsleigh World Cup finish was tied for second in a four-man event at Park City, Utah on 14 November 2009.

Abramovitch's best finish at the FIBT World Championships was eighth in the two-man event at St. Moritz in 2007.

He finished seventh in the two-man event and tied for ninth in the four-man event at the 2010 Winter Olympics in Vancouver.

References
 

1982 births
Bobsledders at the 2010 Winter Olympics
Living people
Olympic bobsledders of Russia
Sportspeople from Krasnoyarsk
Russian male bobsledders